Rock Creek is an unincorporated community in Somervell County, Texas. It is located along Farm to Market Road 202 and is near the headwaters of Rock Creek, a tributary of the Brazos River.

History
Rock Creek was established in the 1850s and served as a center for farmers. It was established after a well was discovered that held water from multiple springs. A post office served Rock creek for two years, from 1858 to 1860. During the Civil War, town citizens organized a cavalry called the Rock Creek Guards. The town was apparently abandoned in 1865, though a church in the area identifies its location as the Rock Creek community.

References

Unincorporated communities in Somervell County, Texas
Unincorporated communities in Texas